Berge Virgin Forest Nature Reserve is a nature reserve in Jämtland County in Sweden. It is part of the EU-wide Natura 2000-network.

The nature reserve protects an area of virgin forest in a hilly landscape, and also contains the Lake Gråssjön. Some parts of the forest is almost completely unaltered by human activity; for example, one tree in the nature reserve has been found to be 580 years old. The forest is mixed coniferous, and contains a lot of coarse woody debris. The unspoilt area is an important habitat for several unusual species, including lesser twayblade, heath spotted orchid and northern coralroot. It is also a preferred habitat for several birds, like osprey, red-throated loon and Eurasian three-toed woodpecker; the latter two are on the national Swedish red list.

References

Nature reserves in Sweden
Natura 2000 in Sweden
Tourist attractions in Jämtland County
Geography of Jämtland County
Protected areas established in 1998
1998 establishments in Sweden
Old-growth forests